Bromadoline (U-47931E) is an opioid analgesic selective for the μ-opioid receptor developed by the Upjohn company in the 1970s. The drug has a potency lying between that of codeine and morphine, being slightly stronger than pentazocine. Bromadoline is related to AH-7921 and U-47700.

See also 
 AH-7921
 U-47700
 Spiradoline
 U-50488

References 

Dimethylamino compounds
Benzamides
Bromoarenes
Synthetic opioids
Mu-opioid receptor agonists